2011 NPSL U.S. Open Cup Qualifying determined the four NPSL qualifiers for the 2011 U.S. Open Cup. In contrast to prior years, where NPSL teams had to qualify for the U.S. Open Cup through the USASA Regional tournaments, the NPSL was awarded four entries to the 2011 U.S. Open Cup. The NPSL elected to give one berth to each of its four divisions.

Northeast Division
The Northeast Division representative was determined by a three-team tournament played on May 7 and May 27, 2011. Brooklyn Italians qualify.

Southeast Division
The Southeast Division's qualifier was determined in a six-team tournament held at Finley Stadium in Chattanooga, Tennessee, on May 27–29, 2011. Chattanooga FC qualify.

Midwest Division
The Midwest Division slot was automatically awarded to the Madison 56ers.  The 56ers earned the bid as 2010 U.S. Open Cup division qualifying champions, as well as the fact none of the other divisional rivals had expressed interest in a qualifying tournament.

West Division
The West Division representative was awarded to the club with the highest point total after its first seven league matches. The berth was clinched by the Hollywood United Hitmen after the San Diego Flash had two games forfeited by the NPSL for the use of an illegal player.

Updated to games played 19 May 2011.
Tiebreakers: (1) Points; (2) Goal difference; (3) Goals scored
*-Includes 3-0 forfeitures imposed on San Diego Flash for using an illegal player

References

External links
 U.S. Soccer Federation
 TheCup.us - Unofficial U.S. Open Cup News 

2011 U.S. Open Cup qualification